Cossula magnifica, the pecan carpenterworm moth, is a moth of the family Cossidae found in the southeastern parts of United States, from North Carolina south to Florida, and west to Mississippi and Texas.

The wingspan is 32–45 mm. Adults are on wing from March to June depending on the location.

The larvae feed on Carya species, including Carya illinoinensis, but also on Diospyros and Quercus species.

External links
Bug Guide

Cossulinae
Taxa named by Herman Strecker
Moths described in 1876